Roumaysa Boualam (born 10 October 1994) is an Algerian amateur boxer. She won the gold medal in the women's minimumweight event at the 2022 Mediterranean Games held in Oran, Algeria. She competed at several editions of the IBA Women's World Boxing Championships.

In 2019, she won the gold medal in the women's flyweight event at the African Games held in Rabat, Morocco.

In 2020, she qualified at the African Olympic Qualification Tournament held in Diamniadio, Senegal to compete at the 2020 Summer Olympics in Tokyo, Japan. She is the first female boxer from Algeria to represent her country at the Summer Olympics. She competed in the women's flyweight event.

References

External links 
 

Living people
1994 births
Algerian women boxers
African Games medalists in boxing
African Games gold medalists for Algeria
Competitors at the 2019 African Games
Flyweight boxers
Olympic boxers of Algeria
Boxers at the 2020 Summer Olympics
Sportspeople from Oran
Competitors at the 2022 Mediterranean Games
Mediterranean Games gold medalists for Algeria
Mediterranean Games medalists in boxing
20th-century Algerian women
21st-century Algerian women